John Wendling (born June 4, 1983) is a former American football safety who played in the National Football League (NFL). He was drafted by the Buffalo Bills in the sixth round (184th overall) of the 2007 NFL Draft. He played college football at Wyoming.

During the 2009 and 2010 seasons, Wendling saw most of his playing time as a gunner on special teams. He led the Bills in special teams tackles in 2009, and also led the Lions in 2010.

College career
Wendling redshirted as a freshman in 2002. In his redshirt freshman season, he played on special teams, ending up with two blocked kicks. During his sophomore redshirt season 2004, Wendling led the Cowboys in tackles with 89, and garnered Honorable Mention All-Conference honors. He also had a huge game against Air Force, making 11 tackles and breaking up two passes in a 43-26 victory over Air Force, eventually to be named MWC Defensive Player of the Week. Wendling also succeeded in his junior season, and once again earned Honorable Mention All-Conference honors.

College statistics
Defensive Stats

Professional career

Buffalo Bills
Wendling was drafted by the Buffalo Bills in the sixth round with the 184th overall pick in the 2007 NFL Draft. He signed a contract with the team on July 24, 2007. He was waived on February 16, 2010.

Detroit Lions
Wendling signed with the Detroit Lions on August 27, 2010.

Wendling was named a special teams Pro Bowl alternate for the NFC during the 2010 NFL season.

Wendling's contract ran out following the 2013 season and he was not re-signed by the Lions. He is still a free agent.

Personal life
Wendling's wife suggested that he grow out a mullet while watching a Colorado Rockies baseball game in which one of the players donned the prolific hairstyle. Wendling's teammate Reggie Bush referred to him as "Joe Dirt" due to Wendling's resemblance to David Spade's character in the 2001 comedy film by the same name.

References

External links
Detroit Lions bio
Wyoming Cowboys football bio

1983 births
Living people
People from Cody, Wyoming
Players of American football from Wyoming
American football safeties
Wyoming Cowboys football players
Buffalo Bills players
Detroit Lions players